The Bohemian Sporting Club was a football club based in Manila, Philippines. It was one of the first clubs to be established within the country, winning 10 national championships in the early 1900s.

After ceasing to exist by the end of the 1930s. A new club of the same name was established in 2018, adopting the historical club's emblem to honor of the success of its history. The new Bohemian Sporting Club's ownership group is headed by chairman Jason de Jong. As of 2019, they are participating in the 7s Football League, a 7-a-side football league based in Manila.

History

Early history
Established in 1910, it was one of the first clubs in the country, alongside the Manila Jockey Club (1900s), Manila Sporting Club (1906), the Sandow Athletic Club (1909) and Manila Nomads Sports Club (1914). It was the club of Paulino Alcántara from 1916 to 1918, who also played for FC Barcelona, as well as Virgilio Lobregat.  The club represented the Philippines in the 1913 Far East Games where the Philippines won over China. The winning goal was made by Rafael Iboleon.

Revival 
A new group began talks in 2017 regarding the possible revival of the Bohemian Sporting Club. The following year the ownership group established the Bohemian Football School in honor of Paulino Alcántara as a vehicle to draw in youth players for the club. The group plans to organize a first team for the club by January 2020.

The club joined the 7's Football League, a Metro Manila-based 7-a-side football league and will debut in the third season of the competition in 2019. Among their players are foreigners Izzo Elhabib, Hamed Hajimehdi, and former Philippine national team player Jason de Jong.

Honours
Philippines Championship

Winners: 1912, 1913, 1915, 1916, 1917, 1918, 1920, 1921, 1922, 1927

References

Football clubs in the Philippines
Association football clubs established in 1910
Sports teams in Metro Manila
Defunct football clubs in the Philippines